Belén De Jesús Cruz Arzate (born 7 November 1998) is a Mexican professional football midfielder who currently plays for UANL of the Liga MX Femenil.

Honors and awards

Club
UANL
Liga MX Femenil: Clausura 2018
Liga MX Femenil: Clausura 2019

International
Mexico U17
 CONCACAF Women's U-17 Championship: 2013

Mexico U20
 CONCACAF Women's U-20 Championship: 2018

References

External links 
 

1998 births
Living people
Sportspeople from Acapulco
Footballers from Guerrero
Mexican women's footballers
Women's association football midfielders
Tigres UANL (women) footballers
Liga MX Femenil players
Mexico women's international footballers
Mexican footballers